The Crown Prince's Hussar Regiment, designated K 7, was a Swedish Army cavalry regiment located in the province of Scania that traced its origins back to the 18th century. It had a number of names over its history, most famously Mörner's Hussar Regiment (Mörnerska husarregementet) during the Napoleonic Wars. It was disbanded in 1927.

History 
The regiment has its origin in a hussar corps raised in 1757. The following year, the corps was organized into Svenska husarregementet with Georg Gustaf Wrangel as commander. The regiment was split in two in 1762 forming Blå and Gula husarregementet (the Blue and Yellow regiments). These two were merged back to one in 1766 with the name Husarregementet.

The regiment changed name quite a few times during the years, being renamed Mörnerska husarregementet in 1801, Cederströmska husarregementet in 1816 and in 1822, when Crown Prince Oscar (the later King Oscar I) became colonel in the regiment, it was renamed Kronprinsens husarregemente. For some months in 1859 and 1860 it was named Konungens värvade husarregemente before being renamed to Husarregimente Konung Karl XV. And finally, as the crown prince Gustaf VI Adolf was born in 1882 the regiment was renamed back to Kronprinsens husarregemente.

Kronprinsens husarregemente was given the designation K 7 (7th Cavalry Regiment) after a general order in 1816. It was a very special regiment because of two things. Firstly, it was the only unit in the Swedish Army without the prefix "Royal" (Kungliga), as it was the Crown Prince's, secondly, it was the largest (ten squadrons) cavalry regiment garrisoned in one town, in the world. It was disbanded in 1927 with personnel being transferred to Norrland Dragoon Regiment and the newly created Scanian Cavalry Regiment, which also contained personnel from the Scanian Dragoon Regiment and the Scanian Hussar Regiment, also disbanded in 1927.

Campaigns 
 The Second War against Napoleon 1813–1814

Commanding officers
Regimental commander from 1758 to 1927. From 1761 to 1766, the regiment was divided into two regiments.

1757–1758: F.U. von Putbus P.J.B. von Platen
1758–1759: Georg Gustaf Wrangel af Adinal
1759–1761: J. Sparre
1761–1764: Fredrik Ulrik von Putbus (Blue (Putbus) Hussar Regiment)
1764–1766: H.S. Mörner (Blue (Putbus) Hussar Regiment)
1761–1763: Georg Gustaf Wrangel af Adinal (Yellow (Wrangel) Hussar Regiment)
1763–1764: Lars Åkerhielm (Yellow (Wrangel) Hussar Regiment)
1764–1766: M.C. Lewenhaupt (Yellow (Wrangel) Hussar Regiment)
1766–1797: H.S. Mörner
1797–1801: S.H. Horn
1801–1816: Hampus Mörner
1816–1822: Bror Cederström
1822–1830: G.B.M. Stackelberg
1830–1849: Achates Carl von Platen
1849–1858: F.A. Sjöcrona
1858–1864: C.M.L. Björnstjerna
1864–1874: C.A.B. Cederström
1874–1883: G.F.A. Boy
1883–1891: Aron Siöcrona
1891–1893: R.W.T. Berg
1893–1902: G.A. von Platen
1902–1910: Christofer von Platen
1910–1913: Bror Munck
1913–1920: Bror Cederström
1920–1920: Edward af Sandeberg
1920–1927: Axel Braunerhjelm

Various

See also 

 List of Swedish regiments

References

Notes

Print

Cavalry regiments of the Swedish Army
1757 establishments in Europe
1927 disestablishments in Europe
Military units and formations established in 1757
Military units and formations disestablished in 1927
Disbanded units and formations of Sweden
Helsingborg Garrison
Malmö Garrison